Fantastic Man is a semi-annual men's fashion magazine which was launched in 2005. It presents men's fashion by detailed interviews with male celebrities and intellectuals from many different backgrounds.

The magazine has been lauded for its art direction, winning the British D&AD award for Best Magazine & Newspaper Design in 2008. 

It is published in Amsterdam by Top Publishers, which also publishes Butt magazine. Fantastic Man launched a website with daily content in 2009 and a sister publication aimed at women, The Gentlewoman, in March 2010.

References

External links
 

2005 establishments in the Netherlands
Biannual magazines
Celebrity magazines
English-language magazines
Magazines established in 2005
Magazines published in Amsterdam
Men's fashion magazines